Don Collins (born 1927-2010) was an Australian international lawn bowler.

Bowls career
He competed in the first World Bowls Championship in Kyeemagh, New South Wales, Australia in 1966  and won a gold medal in the triples with Athol Johnson and John Dobbie and a silver medal in the fours. He also won a gold medal in the team event (Leonard Trophy).

Awards
He was inducted into the South Australian Hall of Fame in 2012 two years after his death in 2010.

References

1927 births
2010 deaths
Australian male bowls players
Bowls World Champions
20th-century Australian people